During the 2001–02 English football season, Mansfield Town Football Club competed in the Football League Third Division where they finished in 3rd position with 79 points, gaining promotion to the Football League Second Division.

Final league table

Results
Mansfield Town's score comes first

Legend

Football League Third Division

FA Cup

League Cup

Football League Trophy

Squad statistics

References
General
Mansfield Town 2001–02 at soccerbase.com (use drop down list to select relevant season)

Specific

2001-02
Mansfield Town